Amy Mae Rodgers (born 4 May 2000) is an English professional football midfielder who plays for London City Lionesses in the FA Women's Championship.

Club career
Rodgers started playing football with Vale Juniors Congleton. She then moved on and played within youth sides at Crewe Alexandra and then at the Everton Ladies's Centre of Excellence before joining the Liverpool youth system.

Liverpool
Rodgers made her first team debut away at Yeovil Town Ladies during the 2017 Spring Series proving to be a talented youngster in the Reds ranks. In 2016 she was named Young Sports Achiever of the Year at The Everybody Awards. The event is held annually to recognise the exceptional achievements of sporting and community heroes in Cheshire East. In May 2019 she was named 2018–19 Fan's Liverpool Women's Player of the Year  and Young Player of the Season. Rodgers is in the running for the Women's Rising Star of the Year award at the 2019 Northwest Football Awards. In July 2020 Rodgers signed a contract extentsion at Liverpool Women FC.

London City Lionesses

Rodgers joined London City Lionesses in July 2021. In a successful first season she was the top goal scorer, top for assists and won goal of the season in the end of season awards. She was also nominated for the On Her Side Championship Player of the Year.

International career
Rodgers has also represented England at youth levels, but also qualifies to play for Scotland through her Glaswegian mother. She debuted with the England U17, playing seven times for the side. Rodgers was a member of the U19's squad who secured qualification for the European Championships  in Scotland in summer 2019. She is a current member of the England WU21 squad.

Personal life
Rodgers combined her full-time football commitments with studying for a Psychology degree at the University of Liverpool. In July 2022 she graduated with a first class honours degree.

References

Social media
Amy_Rodgers on Twitter_
Amy Rodgers Instagram

External links
Liverpool Women Player Profile Amy Rodgers
Spotlight on LFC Women Amy Rodgers
Amy Rodgers at Soccerway
England U19 Euro Squad
The Guardian Interview Sep 2019
Our Game Magazine Interview Sept 2019
Lionesses U21 Squad March 2020
The FA Women's Championship - Getting to know Amy Rodgers 
Liverpool Offside
London City Lionesses
London City Lionessess - Meet the three-year old London football club ready to write more Lionesses history 

English women's footballers
English people of Scottish descent
Women's Super League players
2000 births
Liverpool F.C. Women players
London City Lionesses players
Women's association football midfielders
Footballers from Cheshire
Living people
Women's Championship (England) players